The Wiri were an Aboriginal Australian people of an area on the eastern side of the state of Queensland. They spoke a dialect of the Biri language called Wiri (also known as Widi).

Country
They took in both the Connor and Denham ranges. Wiri territory was basically rainscrub, with drier country on its western flank.

A Traditional Owner Reference Group consisting of representatives of the Yuwibara, Koinmerburra, Barada Barna, Wiri, Ngaro, and those Gia and Juru people whose lands are within Reef Catchments Mackay Whitsunday Isaac region, helps to support natural resource management and look after the cultural heritage sites in the area.

Language

Wiri is a dialect of the Biri language, also spelt Wirri, Widi, Widi, Wierdi, Wirdi, Witi, and also known as Gongolo.

Alternatives names
 Widi
 Wierdi

Notes

Citations

Sources

Aboriginal peoples of Queensland